Kaada & The Late Bloomers In Concert is the fifth solo album by Norwegian pop and experimental artist, Kaada.

Track listing

Musicians
 John Erik Kaada – saw, harps, keys, vocals
 Hanne Rekdal – flute, basson, vocals
 Sigrun Tara Øverland – harps, glocks, vocals
 Jane Helen Johansen – guitars, vocals
 Guro Skumsnes Moe – double bass, vocals
 Renate Engevold – violin, perc, vocals
 Børge Fjordheim – drums, saw, marimba, vocals
 Børre Mølstad – tuba, theremin, vocals
 Espen Alexander Husby – recording and sound engineer
 Hårek Kristoffersen - recording engineer

External links
Internet Movie Database Profile
 Official website

References
 Official website

Kaada albums
2012 live albums